Joey Dujardin (born 16 February 1996) is a Belgian footballer who plays for Sint-Eloois-Winkel. He has also represented the Belgian national youth teams to the Belgium U19.

Career
Dujardin played youth football for Excelsior Mouscron and Zulte-Waregem. On 28 February 2015 he sat on the bench for the first time in the league match against Mechelen. On 15 March 2015, he was allowed to make his debut in the starting eleven against Oostende on the last day of the 2014–15 regular season. With a 0–2 deficit at half-time, Francky Dury decided to replace Dujardin for midfielder Mohamed Messoudi. The game eventually ended 1–4 in favour of the visitors.

In the summer of 2015, Dujardin moved from Zulte Waregem to Lokeren, where he failed to make a first-team appearance. He was then loaned to Hamme in 2016, and joined them permanently the following year. He moved to Sint-Eloois-Winkel in July 2018.

References

External links

1996 births
Living people
Belgian footballers
S.V. Zulte Waregem players
K.S.C. Lokeren Oost-Vlaanderen players
Sint-Eloois-Winkel Sport players
Belgian Pro League players
Association football defenders
R.E. Mouscron players
People from Mouscron
Footballers from Hainaut (province)